Adoxophyes afonini is a moth of the family Tortricidae which is endemic to Vietnam.

The ground colour of the forewings is pale yellowish cream with dense orange reticulation. The markings are rust brown with some orange dots. The hindwings are whitish cream.

Etymology
The species is dedicated to W Afonin, the collector of the species.

References

Moths described in 2009
Endemic fauna of Vietnam
Moths of Asia
Adoxophyes
Taxa named by Józef Razowski